Eskimo Recordings is a Ghent-based record label that grew out of the eclectic parties that took place during the late nineties in the Eskimo Fabriek in Ghent. These underground parties got famous for mixing synthpop, new wave, acid house, funk and rock ‘n’ roll into a new and fresh sound, setting new standards for the Belgian club culture. International as well as local talented DJs such as Mo & Benoelie (later to be The Glimmers), TLP and The Flying Dewale Brothers (later to become 2 Many DJs) were usual guests at the turntables. As the Eskimo Fabriek needed refurbishment at the turn of the century, the Eskimo parties moved on to the Culture Club, and the temporary Belmondo concept at the S.M.A.K museum.

However, the vibe of these parties kept going through a new label that was founded in 2000 by Stefaan Vandenberghe and Dirk De Ruyck: Eskimo Recordings. From the very start, timeless quality and originality were the key values upon which the label was based. Old and new music were carefully combined into a new and different sound.

The first compilation release reflecting this Eskimo ethos came out in June 2000: Eskimo: Various Artists And Many Others. This first volume was compiled by Dirk, Mo & Benoelie and featured 70’s disco and funk as well as pop-soul, obscure acid hip house and new soul gem Revival by Martine Girault. The subsequent volumes 2-4 evolved into a kind of Balearic attitude, akin to DJ Alfredo’s approach in Ibiza's Amnesia in the late 80s.

In 2002, a darker sounding strain of compilations called Serie Noire was released. These compilations relate more to a sound Ghent was familiar with before the Eskimo existed: the new beat.

Soon after that, Mo & Benoelie acquired an international DJ status under the name of The Glimmers, allowing them to spread the Eskimo ethos across the globe. This allowed the Eskimo story to evolve; the compilations were still defined generically but came with a DJ attached now. Various DJs made several compilations, respecting the "Eskimo approach" The Glimmers had started: dig deep in the crates to form a unique listening experience.

Throughout the years, Eskimo grew into an independent label that presented new talent such as Lindstrom & Prins Thomas, who released their debut album in 2005 with Eskimo Recordings. This led to several releases with the like-minded Aeroplane, who immediately caused a splash across Europe and particularly in the UK, becoming the label’s most recognized act.

Time flew by quickly, and in 2012 Eskimo Recordings got to celebrate a decade of existence and did it with a fancy packed compilation release called Eskimonde: A Decade of Eskimo Recordings. This 5-CD release explores the label's catalog from a few different angles. Two "retrospective" discs come along with newly commissioned remixes as well as two final discs that show The Glimmers splitting up for solo mixes, both coursing through Eskimo's back catalog.

A year later, in 2013, Eskimo Recordings entered its second decade of collection releases with a new concept: the color collections. These collections contain each a set of carefully selected songs that were all produced exclusively for this concept. As of June 2016, Pink, Blue, Green, Orange, and Yellow collections have been released.

In 2016, Eskimo Recordings was recognised as one of Europe's most inspiring young labels and was selected by the IMPALA and The Independent Echo for the FIVEUNDERFIFTEEN campaign.

Compilation releases 
 Various Artists and Many Others (Vol 1, Vol 2, Vol 3) (2000, 2001, 2001)
 Recloose presents Jigsaw Music (2001)
 Summermadness Aftersun (2002)
 Serie Noire: Dark Pop and New Beat (2002)
 Eskimonde: A Decade of Eskimo Recordings (2012)
 The Colour Collection
 The Pink Collection (2013)
 The Blue Collection (2013)
 The Green Collection (2014)
 The Orange Collection (2015)
 The Yellow Collection (2016)
 The Red Collection (2017)
 The Purple Collection (2018)

Main artists 

 Aeroplane 
 Allez Allez 
 Baldelli & Dionigi 
 Bill Brewster 
 Blende 
 Bottin 
 Dirty Minds 
 DJ Naughty 
 Downtown Party Network 
 Freeform Five 
 Headman 
 Ilya Santana 
 Ivan Smagghe 
 Jean Winner 
 Kris Menace
 L.S.B. 
 Lindstrøm 
 Lotterboys 
 Low Motion Disco 
 Michoacan 
 NTEIBINT 
 Optimo 
 Peter Visti 
 Prins Thomas 
 Psychemagik 
 Radio Slave 
 Ray Mang 
 Reverso 68 
 Rub' N' Tug 
 Satin Jackets 
 Simone Fedi 
 This Soft Machine

References

External links 
 Spotify account
  official Soundcloud 
  Discogs account
  beatport
  Resident Advisor
 Djbroadcast article
 Eskimo Album review (including Eskimo biography) 
 Interview with The Glimmers on the occasion of the Eskimonde album release 

Belgian record labels